Taman Kota Laksamana is a township in the Central Melaka District, Melaka, Malaysia.

Taman Kota Laksamana located near Jonker Street and Jalan Tengkera. Originally a sea area to be reclaimed land. Now is linked from Melaka Raya area directly through the Malacca Coastal Bridge and Syed Abdullah Aziz Street. First opened in the 1980s and an originally a medium cost housing areas. Taman Kota Laksamana has been turned into a residential area of intermediate luxury type and now slowly upgrade into the business area.

See also
 Geography of Malaysia

Central Melaka District
Populated places in Malacca